Sasha Popovitch (born 8 May 1993) is a Finnish football player currently playing for Finnish Kolmonen side Tampere United.

His father is Russian former football player Valeri Popovitch.

References
  Profile at veikkausliiga.com

1993 births
Living people
Finnish footballers
FC Haka players
Veikkausliiga players
Finnish people of Russian descent
Association football midfielders
Footballers from Tampere